The Battle of Gergovia took place in 52 BC in Gaul at Gergovia, the chief oppidum (fortified town) of the Arverni. The battle was fought between a Roman Republican army, led by proconsul Julius Caesar, and Gallic forces led by Vercingetorix, who was also the Arverni chieftain. The Romans attempted to besiege Gergovia, but miscommunication ruined the Roman plan.  The Gallic cavalry counterattacked the confused Romans and sent them to flight, winning the battle.

The site is identified with Merdogne, since renamed Gergovie, a village located on a hill within the town of La Roche-Blanche, near Clermont-Ferrand, in south central France. Some walls and earthworks still survive from the pre-Roman Iron Age. The battle is well-known in France as an example of a Gallic victory.

Prelude
As with much of the conflict between Rome and Gaul in the first century BC, information about this battle comes principally from Julius Caesar's Commentaries on the Gallic War. There are no surviving Gallic accounts.

Vercingetorix had earlier been expelled from Gergovia, the capital of the Arverni, by its government. In winter 53 BC, while Caesar was gathering his forces for a strike against the Gauls, Vercingetorix came back to Gergovia but was now supported by the Arverni, his people. Caesar states that he was left with a difficult decision. He could have kept his forces safe over the winter, but would have shown Roman weakness in defending its allies the Aedui and thus losing their support. However, he chose to bring Vercingetorix to open battle but risked running out of supplies.

Leaving two legions and all of his baggage train behind in Agedincum, Caesar led the remaining legions to Gergovia. His sieges of Vellaunodunum, Genabum, and Noviodunum en route caused Vercingetorix to march to meet Caesar in open battle at Noviodunum, which Caesar won. Caesar then besieged and captured Avaricum and resupplied there. After resting his forces at Avaricum, he sent his top legate, Titus Labienus, with four legions north; this to keep the northern Gauls from interfering with his campaign against the Arverni.

Caesar then set out in the direction of Gergovia, which Vercingetorix was probably able to guess easily once he had remarked his direction. The heights of Gergovia stand 360 metres (1200 feet) above the plain that they overlook. It is a plateau that is 1500 metres long (0.9 mi) by 700 metres (0.4 mi) wide. It was an advantageous place to hold, as there was only one way in, and a small body of troops could hold the entrance to the place.

Vercingetorix therefore crossed the powerful river Elave (now Allier, a tributary to the Loire) at Nevers, and started marching up and down the bank, mirroring Caesar's movements and destroying all the bridges to keep him from crossing, the purpose presumably being to destroy part of his force as he attempted to cross. Realizing Vercingetorix's plan, Caesar resolved to trick him and cross under his very nose.

Caesar one night camped near the town of Varennes-sur-Allier, where there had previously been a bridge before Vercingetorix had destroyed it. That night, he divided his force into two parts, one part being two thirds of the force, the other being one third of the force. He ordered the larger force to march in six corps as if it were really the full army of six legions. He then ordered it to continue its march south. Vercingetorix, duped, took the bait and followed this part of the force.

Caesar, with the two legions still at Varennes, speedily rebuilt the bridge that had been present there. He then sent for the other force, which the next day stole a march on Vercingetorix and completed a junction with the original force, and crossed the rebuilt bridge. Realizing that he had been duped, Vercingetorix set out south to beat Caesar to Gergovia.

Battle

Five days later Caesar reached Gergovia, the first march being short because most of the troops were tired after marching up the river and back and the last march because the legions arrived at the town. Realizing that its mountainous location made a frontal assault risky, he decided to rely on his superior siege tactics. Upon arriving, Caesar discovered that there was a small hill that the Gauls held that was essential to their holding Gergovia itself. From there, they were able to provide water, grain, and forage.

Caesar took this in a night raid and swiftly stationed two legions there. He then linked it to his main camp by digging a double trench, twelve feet (3.6 metres) wide, with a parapet. The result was a barrier that kept the Gauls from their supplies, which they needed desperately. They were forced to subsist on the meager stream that supplied water to Gergovia itself.

The loyalty of the Aedui to Rome was not entirely stable.  Caesar suggests in his writing that Aeudui leaders were both bribed with gold and sent misinformation by emissaries of Vercingetorix. Caesar had agreed with the Aedui that 10,000 men would protect his line of supplies. Vercingetorix convinced the chief, Convictolitavis, who had been made chief of the tribe by Caesar, to order the same men to join him upon their arrival at the oppidum. They attacked the Romans who were accompanying their supply train, leaving Caesar in an embarrassing position.

His rations threatened, Caesar took four legions from the siege, surrounded the Aedui army, and defeated it. The pro-Roman faction retook control of the Aedui leadership, and Caesar returned to Gergovia with 10,000 pro-Roman Aedui horsemen. The two legions that he had left to continue the siege had been hard-pressed to keep Vercingetorix's much larger force at bay.

Caesar realized that his siege would fail unless he could get Vercingetorix off the high ground. He used one legion as a decoy while the rest moved onto better ground, capturing three Gallic camps in the process. He then ordered a general retreat to lure Vercingetorix off the high ground. However, the order was not heard by most of Caesar's force. Instead, spurred on by the ease with which they captured the camps, they pressed on toward the town and mounted a direct assault on it, exhausting themselves.  The Romans were largely unable to escalade over the walls of Gergovia, lacking ladders.  The Aedui arrived to support the Romans; however the Romans mistook them for enemies at first, proceeding to attack them. Caesar could do little more than cover the retreat.

The noise of the assault alerted Vercingetorix, who arrived and saw the Roman and Aedui in dissension just beneath the walls of Gergovia. Vercingetorix then led a cavalry charge that crushed the Roman lines. Then the warriors left their horses and joined the infantry in their fight against the Romans, who soon had suffered heavy casualties.  Caesar's work records 46 centurions and 700 legionaries as losses.  Modern historians are skeptical; the depiction of the battle as a rout, and one where there were 20,000-40,000 allied Roman soldiers deployed, leads to suspicion that Caesar was downplaying the casualty figures, even if his figures were excluding losses among allied auxiliaries.

Aftermath

Given his losses, Caesar ordered a retreat. In the wake of the battle, Caesar lifted his siege and retreated from the Arverni lands northeastwards in the direction of Aedui territory. Vercingetorix pursued Caesar's army, intent on destroying it. Meanwhile, Labienus had finished his campaign in the north and marched back to Agedincum, Caesar's base in the centre of Gaul. After linking up with Labienus's corps, Caesar marched his united army from Agedincum to confront Vercingetorix's victorious army. The two armies met at the Vingeanne, Caesar won the subsequent battle. Caesar then pursued Vercingetorix and the remnant of his army to Alesia where Caesar laid siege to and eventually won the Battle of Alesia, a decisive victory over Vercingetorix.

Even under Roman control, Gergovia continued to be an influential stronghold for decades.  In AD 10–20, the local capital was moved to Augustonemetum, and Gergovia's importance declined.

Legacy
Emperor Napoleon III was a patron of archaeology and funded research into France's Gallic past, including the battles of Gergovia and Alesia.  As a result of the sponsored dig at Gergovia, the town of Merdogne, the closest to the commonly agreed likely site of the battle, was renamed to Gergovie in honor of its past in 1865.  Interest has continued since the 1800s.  On the plateau where the battle occurred, the Gergovie Monument was constructed in 1900 in honor of the event.  An archaeological dig in the 1990s discovered what they believe to be the trench that Caesar describes being dug between the two Roman camps as well as various Roman artifacts from the period.   A new museum was constructed from 2015–2019 dedicated to the battle, the Musée de Gergovie; the museum opened in October 2019.

The famous French comic Asterix loosely references the battle in the 1967 book Asterix and the Chieftain's Shield.

References

External links
 , by Julius Caesar
 Archaeological Museum of the Battle of Gergovia, official website

Campaigns of the Gallic Wars
52 BC
Vercingetorix
Battles of the Gallic Wars
Battles in Auvergne-Rhône-Alpes
History of Auvergne

sv:Gergovia